Fidler-Greywillow Wildland Park is a wildland provincial park located in northeastern Alberta, Canada within the Regional Municipality of Wood Buffalo. Summer activities include activities like back-country camping, hunting, kayaking, and fishing, and Winters offer Snowmobiling. Random backcountry camping is allowed on Bustard Island.

Geography
The Fidler-Greywillow Wildland Park lies within the natural regions of the Canadian Shield - Kazan Uplands, and the Boreal Forest - Athabasca Plain.

The park starts at an unnamed creek along the northwest shore of Lake Athabasca to Fidler Point. It also encompasses several islands in the lake; These include Bustard Island, Burntwood Island, and the Lucas Islands To the southeast of Burntwood Island is Egg Island a small island part of the 
Egg Island Ecological Reserve.

Flora
Forbs specimens included; Drosera anglica (Oblong-leaved sundew), Menyanthes trifoliata (Buck-bean), Triglochin maritima (Side arrow grass). Graminoids specimens included; Carex chordorrhiza (Prostrate sedge), Carex lasiocarpa (Woollyfruit sedge), Carex limosa (mud sedge), Carex rostrata (Beaked sedge), Juncus stygius (Marsh rush), Scheuchzeria palustris (Scheuchzeria). Bryophytes specimens included; Sphagnum angustifolium (fine peat/bogmoss), Warnstorfia exannulata (brown peat moss).

Common trees found on the mainland and islands includes the black spruce (Picea mariana),  jack pine (Pinus banksiana), white spruce (Picea glauca), and the paper birch (Betula papyrifera) In a 2005 study of flora in the park the first record of Carex echinata (star sedge) was found on Burntwood Island.

Transportation
Travel to the park is float-plane form Fort McMurray, as by boat from Fort Chipewyan. There are no summer access roads that run into the park.

See also
List of provincial parks in Alberta
List of Canadian provincial parks
List of National Parks of Canada

References

External links
Fidler-Greywillow Wildland Park

Parks in Alberta
Provincial parks of Alberta
Protected areas established in 1998
Fidler-Greywillow Wildland
Regional Municipality of Wood Buffalo
Lake Athabasca